"Coldblooded" is a song written and recorded by James Brown. It was released in 1974 as the B-side of "Funky President (People It's Bad)" and charted #99 Pop. It also appeared on the album Hell. Writing in Rolling Stone, Robert Palmer praised the song as a "sure-fire disco [smash], the kind of no-nonsense party music one expects from Soul Brother Number One."

Personnel
 James Brown - vocals
 Isaiah "Ike" Oakley - trumpet
 Fred Wesley - trombone
 Maceo Parker - alto sax
 Jimmy Parker - alto sax
 St. Clair Pinckney - tenor sax
 Jimmy Nolen - guitar
 Hearlon "Cheese" Martin - guitar
 Fred Thomas - bass
 John "Jabo" Starks - drums
 Johnny Griggs - congas
 Fred Wesley or Bob Both - percussion

References

James Brown songs
Songs written by James Brown
1974 songs